Box is a surname. Notable people with the surname include:

Arts and entertainment
Betty Box (1915–1999), British film producer
C. J. Box (born 1958), American author
David Box (1943–1964), American rock musician
Edgar Box, pseudonym used by writer Gore Vidal
John Box (1920–2005), British film designer
Mick Box (born 1947), British guitarist
Muriel Box (1905–1991), British writer
Steve Box (born 1967), British animator
Sydney Box (1907–1983), British film producer

Science and technology
Charles Richard Box (1866–1951), English physician and anatomist
Don Box, Microsoft employee
George E. P. Box (1919–2013), British statistician
Jason Box, American glaciologist

Sports
Ab Box (1909–2000), Canadian football player
Cloyce Box (1923–1993), American football player
George Box (ice hockey) (1892–1962), Canadian ice hockey player
Harold Box, rugby league player of the 1970s–1980s
Kenneth Box (born 1930), British track and field sprinter
Peter Box (1932–2018), Australian rules footballer

Other
George Herbert Box (1869-1933), British Old Testament scholar, father of Pelham, uncle of George E.P.
Godfrey Box, 16th century British entrepreneur
Henry "Box" Brown (1815  after 1889), American slave who had himself mailed in a box to freedom
John C. Box (1871–1941), American politician
Pelham Horton Box (1898-1937), British historian

See also
Pandora Boxx (born 1972), American drag queen, comedian, and reality television personality
Shannon Boxx (born 1977), American soccer player